Signes extérieurs de richesse is a French comedy film directed by Jacques Monnet, written by Alain Godard and Jacques Monnet, and released in 1983.

Plot
Jean-Jacques Lestrade is the owner of a renowned veterinary clinic in Paris who lives in a luxurious apartment. He is part of Parisian high society and lives a wealthy lifestyle surrounded by young women and money. He relies on his trusty accountant, Jérôme Bouvier, to manage his finances. All goes well until the day that Béatrice Flamand, a tax inspector, shows up at his clinic, at which point Lestrade is now in trouble.

Cast
 Josiane Balasko: Béatrice Flamand
 Claude Brasseur: Jean-Jacques Lestrade 
 Jean-Pierre Marielle: Jérôme Bouvier
 Roland Giraud: Gerard Picard
 Charlotte de Turckheim: Sylvie Picard
 Jean Reno: Marc Letellier
 Xavier Saint-Macary: Bianchi
 Pascale Ogier: Medical Assistant

References

External links
 

1983 films
1983 comedy films
French comedy films
1980s French films